The 2022 Koper Open was a professional tennis tournament played on outdoor clay courts. It was the first edition of the tournament which was part of the 2022 ITF Women's World Tennis Tour. It took place in Koper, Slovenia between 2 and 8 May 2022.

Singles main draw entrants

Seeds

 1 Rankings are as of 25 April 2022.

Other entrants
The following players received wildcards into the singles main draw:
  Kristina Dmitruk
  Živa Falkner
  Pia Lovrič

The following players received entry from the qualifying draw:
  Jessie Aney
  Ingrid Gamarra Martins
  Sada Nahimana
  Lena Papadakis
  Lara Smejkal
  Maria Timofeeva
  Anna Turati
  Bianca Turati

The following player received entry as a lucky loser:
  Timea Jarušková

Champions

Singles

  Kathinka von Deichmann def.  Andrea Lázaro García, 3–6, 6–3, 6–2

Doubles

  Xenia Knoll /  Samantha Murray Sharan def.  Conny Perrin /  Joanne Züger, 6–3, 6–2

References

External links
 2022 Koper Open at ITFtennis.com
 Official website

2022 ITF Women's World Tennis Tour
2022 in Slovenian sport
May 2022 sports events in Slovenia